Caldbergh (Caldeber in the Domesday Book) is a hamlet within the Yorkshire Dales, North Yorkshire, England. It lies about four miles south of Leyburn. East Scrafton and Coverham are nearby.

References

Villages in North Yorkshire
Coverdale (dale)